This is a list of television programs and movies that were formerly broadcast by the pay television channel SF, which closed 31 December 2013 and was replaced by Syfy. Programs that are listed in bold are currently, or have previously, aired on Syfy.

Final programming

Original programming
Go Pop

International programming
The 4400
The Almighty Johnsons
Alphas
The Andromeda Strain
Angel
Battlestar Galactica
Buffy the Vampire Slayer
Caprica
Charmed
Continuum
The Dead Zone
Defiance
Doctor Who
Early Edition
Eureka
Face Off
Farscape
Forever Knight
Ghost Hunters International
Harper's Island
Hollywood Treasure
Jericho
Kapow!
Kingdom Hospital
Knight Rider
Lost Girl
Medium
Odyssey 5
Paranormal Witness
Quantum Leap
Ripley's Believe It or Not!
Sanctuary
Sliders
Stargate Atlantis
Stargate SG-1
Stargate Universe
Star Trek: Deep Space Nine
Star Trek: Enterprise
Star Trek: The Next Generation
Star Trek: The Original Series
Star Trek: Voyager
Surface
Thunderbirds
Todd and the Book of Pure Evil
Warehouse 13
Xena: Warrior Princess
The X-Files

Documentaries
Captains of the Final Frontier
Conspiracy Theory: Did We Land On The Moon
Ghosts Caught on Tape: Fact or Fiction
World's Greatest Hoaxes: Secrets Finally Revealed

Animation
Astro Boy
Spider-Man
X-Men

Movies
The 6th Day
Anaconda
Anacondas: The Hunt for the Blood Orchid
Bram Stoker's Dracula
Carrie
Christine
Close Encounters of the Third Kind
The Covenant
Dawn of the Dead
Evolution
The Exorcism of Emily Rose
Fortress 2: Re-Entry
Frankenfish
From Stargate to Atlantis
Gattaca
Ghost Rider
Ghostbusters
Ghostbusters II
Godzilla
Hellboy
Jumanji
Lara Croft Tomb Raider: The Cradle of Life
Last Action Hero
Men in Black
Poltergeist
Real Fear
Resident Evil: Apocalypse
Resident Evil: Extinction
RoboCop
RoboCop 2
Screamers
Serenity
Species
Spider-Man
Star Trek: Nemesis
Stargate
Stargate: The Ark of Truth
Stargate: Beyond the Mythology of Stargate SG-1
Stargate: Continuum
Starship Troopers 2: Hero of the Federation
Stealth
The Terminator
Terminator 2: Judgment Day
UFOs: Best Evidence
Underworld: Evolution
Urban Legend
Zoom

Past programming

Original programming

International programming
Afterworld
Babylon 5
Battlestar Galactica
Bionic Woman
Captain Scarlet and the Mysterons
Cleopatra 2525
Earth 2
Earth: Final Conflict
Firefly
Galactica 1980 
Heroes
Jake 2.0
Kingdom Hospital
Lexx
Missing
Mysterious Ways
The Outer Limits
Sea of Souls
seaQuest DSV (later retitled seaQuest 2032)
The Sentinel
Threshold
V
Who Wants to Be a Superhero? 
Wolf Lake

Animation
Black Lagoon
Blade
Blood+
Cowboy Bebop
Ghost in the Shell: Stand Alone Complex
Iron Man
Men in Black: The Series
The Real Ghostbusters
Samurai X
Wolverine

Movies
30 Days of Night
Bicentennial Man
Bill & Ted's Bogus Journey 
The Butterfly Effect
The Cave
Cowboy Bebop: The Movie
Dragon Wars: D-War
The Fog
The Forgotten
Hunter Prey
Invasion of the Body Snatchers
Lara Croft: Tomb Raider 
Mars Attacks!
The Medallion
Men in Black II
Pitch Black
Prom Night
Running Against Time
Skinwalkers
Terminator 3: Rise of the Machines
Terwar
Thoughtcrimes
Under the Mountain
Vampire Bats
Warbirds
Wind Chill

Unaired original programming
Arrowhead (currently in production; to be aired in 2014 on another network due to SF's closure)

References

Sci Fi Channel
TV-Sci Fi Channel